View Park−Windsor Hills is  an unincorporated community in Los Angeles County, California. The View Park neighborhood is the community surrounding Angeles Vista Boulevard and the Windsor Hills neighborhood is on the southern end to the north of Slauson Avenue. 

View Park−Windsor Hills is one of the wealthiest primarily African-American neighborhoods in the United States. The two neighborhoods are part of a band of neighborhoods, from Culver City's Fox Hills district on the west to the Los Angeles neighborhood of Leimert Park on the east, that comprise the one of the wealthiest geographically contiguous historically black communities in the western United States. This corridor also includes the neighborhood of Baldwin Hills and the unincorporated community of Ladera Heights. It was developed between 1923 and 1970. While the neighborhood is still predominantly African-American, the area is undergoing a demographic shift as new homeowners (mostly Caucasian, Asian families), who work in nearby  Culver City, Downtown Los Angeles, Santa Monica and other job hub areas are moving into the neighborhood.

Per the 2020 census, the population of View Park-Windsor Hills was 11,419.

History

View Park

View Park was developed between 1923 and 1970 an upper-class neighborhood akin to the style of Cheviot Hills, Bel-Air, Brentwood and Hancock Park by the Los Angeles Investment Company. Along with neighboring Ladera Heights and Baldwin Hills, it is one of the wealthiest African-American areas in the United States. It contains a collection of houses and mansions in the Spanish Colonial Revival Style, Spanish Colonial, Mid Century and Mediterranean Revival Style architecture, most of which remain today.  View Park architecture features the work of many notable architects, such as the Los Angeles Investment Company, Postle & Postle, R. F. Ruck, Paul Haynes, Leopold Fischer, H. Roy Kelley, Raphael Soriano, Charles W. Wong, Robert Earl, M.C. Drebbin, Vincent Palmer, Theodore Pletsch and Homer C. Valentine. It is also rumored that renowned African American architect Paul Williams had built several homes in View Park.

National Register of  Historic Places
On July 12, 2016, View Park was listed on the National Register of Historic Places, an initiative led by View Park Conservancy in which almost 700 View Park residents donated over $100,000 to complete the historic work needed to complete the neighborhood's nomination. View Park is the largest National Register historic district in the country based on African American and county history, and the largest in California in terms of total property owners.

Windsor Hills
Windsor Hills was developed in the late 1930s by  Marlow-Burns Development Company. It was the first subdivision in Southern California for which the newly created Federal Housing Administration provided mortgage insurance. It also contains a collection of houses and mansions in the Spanish Colonial Revival Style, minimal traditional and Mediterranean Revival Style architecture. African-Americans were forbidden to live in either area until the Supreme Court's invalidation of racial restrictive covenants in 1948.

Geography
View Park−Windsor Hills is located at  (33.993662, -118.346950).

Climate
The region has a warm-summer Mediterranean climate.

Demographics
For statistical purposes, the United States Census Bureau has defined View Park−Windsor Hills as a census-designated place (CDP). The census definition of the area may not precisely correspond to local understanding of the area. As of end of 2020, View Park-Windsor hills ranks # 1 among top 10 richest black communities in US, with an average family income of $159,168.

2020 census

Note: the US Census treats Hispanic/Latino as an ethnic category. This table excludes Latinos from the racial categories and assigns them to a separate category. Hispanics/Latinos can be of any race.

2010 Census
At the 2010 census View Park−Windsor Hills had a population of 11,075. The racial makeup of View Park−Windsor Hills was 669 (6.0%) White (4.2% Non-Hispanic White), 9,392 (84.8%) African-American, 45 (0.4%) Native American, 147 (1.3%) Asian, 4 (0.0%) Pacific Islander, 244 (2.2%) from other races, and 574 (5.2%) from two or more races. Hispanic or Latino of any race were 720 people (6.5%).

The census reported that 10,999 people (99.3% of the population) lived in households, 14 (0.1%) lived in non-institutionalized group quarters, and 62 (0.6%) were institutionalized.

There were 4,535 households, 1,246 (27.5%) had children under the age of 18 living in them, 1,704 (37.6%) were opposite-sex married couples living together, 985 (21.7%) had a female householder with no husband present, 276 (6.1%) had a male householder with no wife present.  There were 166 (3.7%) unmarried opposite-sex partnerships, and 38 (0.8%) same-sex married couples or partnerships. 1,354 households (29.9%) were one person and 575 (12.7%) had someone living alone who was 65 or older. The average household size was 2.43.  There were 2,965 families (65.4% of households); the average family size was 2.97.

The age distribution was 2,090 people (18.9%) under the age of 18, 755 people (6.8%) aged 18 to 24, 2,286 people (20.6%) aged 25 to 44, 3,586 people (32.4%) aged 45 to 64, and 2,358 people (21.3%) who were 65 or older.  The median age was 47.1 years. For every 100 females there were 80.6 males.  For every 100 females age 18 and over, there were 77.0 males.

There were 4,777 housing units at an average density of 2,593.4 per square mile, of the occupied units 3,275 (72.2%) were owner-occupied and 1,260 (27.8%) were rented. The homeowner vacancy rate was 1.3%; the rental vacancy rate was 5.2%.  8,297 people (74.9% of the population) lived in owner-occupied housing units and 2,702 people (24.4%) lived in rental housing units.

2000
At the 2000 census there were 10,958 people, 4,539 households, and 3,041 families in the CDP. The population density was 5,895.8 inhabitants per square mile (2,274.7/km). The racial makeup of the CDP was 88.0% African American, 5.4% White, 0.2% Native American, 1.1% Asian, 0.1% Pacific Islander, 1.2% from other races, and 4.2% from two or more races. Hispanic or Latino of any race were 2.7%. The area had the highest percentage of African-American residents of any CDP in the Western United States.

Of the 4,539 households 23.2% had children under the age of 18 living with them, 42.3% were married couples living together, 19.1% had a female householder with no husband present, and 33.0% were non-families. 28.9% of households were one person and 10.9% were one person aged 65 or older.  The average household size was 2.40 and the average family size was 2.94.

The age distribution was 20.3% under the age of 18, 5.6% from 18 to 24, 26.4% from 25 to 44, 28.2% from 45 to 64, and 19.6% 65 or older.  The median age was 44 years. For every 100 females there were 84.2 males.  For every 100 females age 18 and over, there were 79.3 males.

The median household income was $90,876 and the median family income  was $100,124. Males had a median income of $56,461 versus $43,663 for females. The per capita income for the CDP was $34,382.  About 3.1% of families and 5.1% of the population were below the poverty line, including 4.2% of those under age 18 and 3.2% of those age 65 or over.

Parks and recreation
View Park-Windsor Hills has a main park called Rueben Ingold Park. The park opened on August 17, 1971, and is adjacent to Kenneth Hahn State Recreation Area with the newly Stocker Trail Corridor pathway to connect the two. Residents also use the Valley Ridge Avenue hill for exercising.

Government
The Los Angeles County Department of Health Services SPA 6 South Area Health Office Ruth-Temple Health Center in Los Angeles, serves  View Park-Windsor Hills.

In the state legislature View Park−Windsor Hills is located in the 26th Senate District, represented by Democrat Holly Mitchell, and in the 54th Assembly District, represented by Democrat Sydney Kamlager-Dove. Federally, View Park−Windsor Hills is located in California's 37th congressional district, which is represented by Democrat Karen Bass.

Education

Schools

The CDP community is within the Los Angeles Unified School District. A portion is also within the Inglewood Unified School District.

Several elementary schools serve the LAUSD portion of community are as follows:
 54th Street Elementary School (K-5) (View Park)
 Cowan Elementary School (1–5)
 Windsor Math/Science/Aerospace Magnet, 5215 Overdale Drive. (K-5, zoned only for Kindergarten) (Windsor Hills)

All areas in LAUSD are zoned to:
Audubon Middle School
 Crenshaw High School
 View Park Preparatory High School

Some areas are jointly zoned to Audubon Middle School and Daniel Webster Middle School . Some areas are jointly zoned to Audubon Middle School, Orville Wright Middle School, and Palms Middle School. Some areas are jointly zoned to Crenshaw High School and Westchester High School. View Park Preparatory High School also serves as the center school for the View Park neighborhood. The school is an urban preparatory school partnered with LAUSD.

Emergency services

Police services
Criminal Law Enforcement Services including patrol are provided by the Los Angeles County Sheriff's Department out of the Marina Del Ray station with a substation in the Ladera shopping center. Deputy Sheriffs also perform traffic enforcement and are often first on scene to vehicle accidents and Fire/EMS calls.

As an unincorporated area, Traffic Law Enforcement Services are provided by the California Highway Patrol (CHP) out of the West LA Area Office in Culver City. 

The Los Angeles Unified School District Police has jurisdiction on the areas LAUSD elementary school campuses.

Fire/EMS services

Fire and EMS services are provided by the Los Angeles County Fire Department Station 58 (Engine and Medic unit) and Station 38 (Engine).

Surrounding Agencies

The Los Angeles City Fire Department and Culver City Fire Department border this area.  The Los Angeles, Inglewood, Inglewood School District, and Culver City Police Departments border this area.

Library
Library services are provided by the County of Los Angeles Public Library View Park Library.  The library will be renamed after late community resident Bebe Moore Campbell.

Landmarks
Ray Charles Residence at 4863 Southridge Avenue. The home was built in 1965.
The Googie-style Wich Stand  now known as Simply Wholesome is located at Slauson Avenue and Overhill Avenue.
The Doumakes House. The first historic landmark in unincorporated LA County at Angeles Vista Blvd and West Blvd.

Notable people

View Park-Windsor Hills has been home to numerous actors, athletes,  Filmmakers and  musicians, including:
Ermias Joseph Asghedom, known professionally as Nipsey Hussle
Angelle Brooks, Actress
Charles Burnett, Filmmaker and director
Bebe Moore Campbell, Novelist 
Ray Charles, (1930–2004) Singer
Doria Ragland, mother of Meghan, Duchess of Sussex
James Cleveland (1931–1991) Gospel Singer, Arranger Composer
Michael Cooper, Former NBA player and WNBA head coach
Loretta Devine, Actress
Curt Flood Former professional baseball player
Lita Gaithers, Tony Award-nominated playwright, singer/songwriter 
Jester Hairston, composer, arranger, and actor
Lisa Gay Hamilton, Actress
Sally Hampton, Writer, Producer, Actress
Earl Ofari Hutchinson, Journalist, Author and Broadcaster
Louis Johnson, baseball player
Robert Kardashian, attorney
Regina King, Academy award winning Actress and television director 
Mike Love, Musician, founding member of the Beach Boys
Stan Love (basketball), Former NBA player, brother of Mike Love
Marilyn McCoo, singer
Meghan, Duchess of Sussex, retired Actress, Member of The British Royal Family
Issa Rae, Writer, Actress, and Television Producer
Leslie Sykes, KABC-TV  news co-anchor
Ike & Tina Turner, Recording duo
Clara Ward, (1924–1973) Gospel singer
Dave Waymer, NFL Football Player
Gerald Wilson, jazz Composer, arranger, conductor
Nancy Wilson, Vocalist

See also

Bel Air
 Baldwin Hills, Los Angeles
 Kenneth Hahn State Recreation Area

References

Census-designated places in Los Angeles County, California
Baldwin Hills (mountain range)
1920s establishments in California
Census-designated places in California
Populated places established in the 1920s
South Los Angeles